Jorge González Moral (born 24 February 1992), commonly known as Pesca, is a Spanish footballer who plays for SD Logroñés on loan from Arandina CF mainly as a midfielder.

Club career
Born in Burgos, Pesca kicked off his youth career with the youth team of Atletico Michelin. Later he joined Arandina and after two seasons, he moved to the youth team of Burgos. He received interest of various clubs like Numancia but signed for Real Valladolid where he was assigned to the B team in 2012.
In June of the same year, he received a call up from the first team manager Miroslav Đukić to train with the senior squad in the pre season. He injured his right ankle while training in October and was ruled out of play for three weeks. In November, it was announced that the Đukić had called him to the first team for the club's last four matches of the season.

In July 2014, without having made any appearance for the senior team, Pesca signed for the C team of Villarreal. He made his league debut for the club in the month of November against Muro. Coming as an 82nd minute substitute, he found the net in the 93rd minute while resulted in the match ending in a draw. After a short stint with Alavés B, he moved to Rayo Majadahonda in August 2015 which competed in Segunda División B.

After a single season with Tercera División club Guadalajara of the third tier, in 2017 Pesca moved abroad for the time and signed for Austrian Football First League side Kapfenberger SV joining Spaniard David Agudo.

In July 2018, Pesca joined Arandina CF. He was loaned out to SD Logroñés on 24 January 2019 for the rest of the season.

Career statistics

References

External links 

1992 births
Living people
Association football midfielders
Real Valladolid Promesas players
Villarreal CF C players
Deportivo Alavés B players
CF Rayo Majadahonda players
CD Guadalajara (Spain) footballers
Arandina CF players
SD Logroñés players
Kapfenberger SV players
2. Liga (Austria) players
Segunda División B players
Tercera División players
Spanish expatriate footballers
Spanish footballers